In January 1978, a stolen 1974 Dino 246 GTS was discovered buried in a yard in Los Angeles. The find gathered extensive national media attention, although the origins and fate of the car remained a mystery for some time. The case was eventually revealed to been in a more complicated and fraudulent scheme than was first thought.

The incident
Some children playing in the dirt reportedly discovered something shallowly buried. They alerted sheriff's deputies Joe Sabas and Dennis (misreported as Lenny) Carroll, who had a team investigate the object, which proved to be a Ferrari Dino. It was initially reported that the car had been stolen in 1974, as had been reported, and buried by the thieves. The thieves had clumsily attempted to preserve the car by covering it with carpets, but left the windows open.

Later it transpired that the owner, plumber Rosendo Cruz, apparently conspired to commit insurance fraud with the supposed thieves. They were supposed to take the Dino to a chop shop to be broken up for parts, but instead hid it, intending to dig it up later, and forgot where it was buried.

Aftermath
Real estate businessman Brad Howard purchased the car from Farmers Insurance, to which ownership had defaulted, and had it restored by Ferrari expert Giuseppe Cappalonga. Due to the drought conditions during the car's burial, there was relatively little rust. As of 2019, it was in perfect running condition in Howard's possession. It was easily restored and has been very active since 1978 when he purchased it.  The owner continues to drive it regularly, and even takes it to shows and classic races.

References

Ferrari
Fraud in the United States

Insurance fraud